Haluka (or Haluka.js), is a lightweight node.js web framework for rapid development which makes building applications simpler and faster. It includes hassle-free setup procedure for all sorts of projects from prototype to enterprise-grade solutions and APIs. It is released as free and open-source software under the MIT License.

Features
Haluka is a framework for rapid development. It is a "batteries included" framework, offering an extensive ecosystem of libraries and tools for rapid application development so that business needs and problems can be focused over deciding on which package to use. It is built on top of Node.js and Express.js so the framework is 100% JavaScript to its core. Inspired by Laravel, it is easier for developers with experience in PHP to dive into the framework as it has a directory structure and configuration files similar to it. Aside from models, views and controllers, Haluka comes with helpers, middleware and event-listeners, database, etc. all organised and packed into a single framework.

A number of other packages are included behind the scenes to enable rapid-application development experience.

References

External links

JavaScript web frameworks